The Evening Star is a 1996 American comedy-drama film. It is a sequel to the Academy Award-winning 1983 film Terms of Endearment starring Shirley MacLaine, who reprises the role of Aurora Greenway, for which she won an Oscar in the original film. Based on the 1992 novel by Larry McMurtry, the screenplay is by Robert Harling, who also served as director.

The story takes place about thirteen years after the original, following the characters from 1988 to 1993. It focuses on Aurora's relationship with her three grandchildren, her late daughter Emma's best friend Patsy and her longtime housekeeper Rosie. Along the way Aurora enters into a relationship with a younger man, while watching the world around her change as old friends pass on and her grandchildren make lives of their own.

Miranda Richardson co-stars as a Houston divorcee and Aurora's rival, Patsy Carpenter. Juliette Lewis plays Aurora's rebellious granddaughter, Melanie Horton, with Marion Ross as Aurora's housekeeper (Golden Globe nominated in the Best Supporting Actress category) and Bill Paxton as Aurora's mental health counselor and lover. The movie was Ben Johnson's last, in a career that spanned over 60 years. The film is dedicated to him. Jack Nicholson returns in an extended cameo appearance, playing the role he played in Terms of Endearment, retired astronaut Garrett Breedlove.

Unlike its predecessor, The Evening Star received negative reviews from critics and was a box office bomb.

Plot
Years have passed since the death of her daughter, Emma. Aurora Greenway is still her usual strong, willful self, but all is not well with the three grandchildren she raised after Emma's death, particularly eldest boy Tommy, who is serving time in jail on a drug charge.

Younger grandson Teddy now has a girlfriend and a son, neither of whom Aurora warms to. Melanie (who is both the youngest and the only girl out of the three grandkids), is still living with Aurora but giving serious thought to moving out. Aurora's only true companion is housekeeper Rosie, particularly now that a man she's been spending time with, the General, is a friend, not a romance.

Her late daughter's old friend, Patsy, still has a home in Houston and thinks of herself as Aurora's friend now, dispensing advice to Melanie, something that Aurora does not appreciate. Though she caught her boyfriend cheating on her and subsequently tries to overdose on Patsy's muscle relaxants, Melanie eventually moves out to Los Angeles with the same boyfriend after he pleads with her for a fresh start.

Meanwhile, Rosie is being courted by an elderly gentleman named Arthur, who has bought astronaut Garrett Breedlove's former house next door. On seeing how lonely Aurora obviously is, Rosie tricks her into seeing a licensed counselor, Jerry, to whom Aurora admits that she is still seeking "the love of my life." She starts to chronicle her life in scrapbooks, which helps her loneliness.

Jerry and Aurora begin a romantic relationship; however, Jerry also has a fling with Patsy, which Aurora discovers. Aurora ends the relationship after learning it centers around Jerry's long-unresolved Oedipus complex issues.

After many visits to Tommy in prison, Aurora is finally able to reach him through scrapbook pages of him with his mother Emma when he was a child. This  helps to heal his anger and mend the broken relationship with his grandmother.

Needing a new cause, Aurora takes charge after Melanie decides to stay in Los Angeles to try to become an actress, her boyfriend having left her for another woman. Aurora is peeved to discover that Patsy has the same idea. Melanie succeeds in landing a role on a television show, which Aurora and Patsy celebrate, but they end up having a fight on the flight home.

When Aurora comes home, however, she learns that Rosie is critically ill. She is left once more facing the prospect of being alone. Against Arthur's wishes, Aurora carries Rosie 'home' to the Greenway house, and tends to her lovingly until Rosie eventually succumbs to her illness. Arthur brings Rosie's ashes to Aurora, asking her to do what she feels would be best for Rosie's memory.

A few days later, Aurora is writing in her diary in her backyard gazebo alongside Rosie's urn when Garrett surprises her. This visit cheers her up immensely and seems to rejuvenate her spirits; she confides that she's still searching for her one true love, and Garrett advises her to find that true love soon because "there aren't that many shopping days left till Christmas."

Tommy is released from prison and he and Aurora embrace at the prison exit where she has arrived to take him home. He lands a promising job after taking computer classes in prison, and eventually he and his new girlfriend start a family and get married. Their child, Henry, is completely doted upon by Aurora, who starts teaching him music lessons.

Scrapbooks continue to be filled year by year, until one day Aurora suffers a stroke while teaching Henry the piano; this slows Aurora but also brings the family closer together, with Patsy spending all her days tending to Aurora's needs and the rest of the family close by. She and Patsy make peace with each other at last, apologizing for so many years of battling when both loved the same family so fiercely. At Christmastime, Aurora is bedridden but surrounded by all her grandchildren and friends as she passes quietly, calling out softly to Emma. The ending scene features young Henry playing the familiar theme from Terms of Endearment on the piano as Tommy sits beside him.

Cast
 Shirley MacLaine as Aurora Greenway
 Bill Paxton as Jerry Bruckner
 Juliette Lewis as Melanie Horton
 Miranda Richardson as Patsy Carpenter
 Ben Johnson as Arthur Cotton
 Scott Wolf as Bruce Burgess
 George Newbern as Tommy Horton
 Marion Ross as Rosie Dunlop
 Mackenzie Astin as Teddy Horton
 Donald Moffat as Hector Scott
 Jack Nicholson as Garrett Breedlove
 China Kantner as Jane
 Jennifer Grant as Ellen
 Jake Langerud as Henry

Reception
Unlike Terms of Endearment, the film was not a box-office success, grossing only $12,767,815 (unadjusted) and received poor reviews from critics. On Rotten Tomatoes it holds a 25% rating from 28 reviews. Audiences surveyed by CinemaScore gave the film a grade "A−" on scale of A to F.

Roger Ebert, in his Chicago Sun-Times review of December 27, 1996, described The Evening Star as "a completely unconvincing sequel", awarding it one-and-a-half stars of a possible four. He said the story lacks any points of interest, and found the character developments contrived and clunky. 

Mick LaSalle, in a December 25 San Francisco Chronicle review, similarly said that the film lacks a story and instead "is constructed as a series of incidents involving Aurora and her family." He praised Shirley MacLaine's performance but derided the characterizations and overall tedium of the film, summing it up as "one of the worst films of the year". 

Ebert and LaSalle both criticized the numerous character deaths, interpreting them as a desperate attempt to maintain the viewer's interest.

References

External links
 
 
 

1996 films
1990s English-language films
1996 comedy-drama films
Films based on American novels
Films set in Houston
Films shot in Houston
Paramount Pictures films
Rysher Entertainment films
American sequel films
American comedy-drama films
Films scored by William Ross
1996 directorial debut films
1990s American films